Narendra Bhondekar is a politician from Bhandara district, Maharashtra. He is current Member of Maharashtra Legislative Assembly from Bhandara Vidhan Sabha constituency as an independent member.

Positions held
 2009: Elected to Maharashtra Legislative Assembly 
 2019: Re-Elected to Maharashtra Legislative Assembly

References

External links
  Shivsena Home Page 

1979 births
Living people
Shiv Sena politicians
People from Bhandara
Maharashtra MLAs 2019–2024